Sheesha (transl. Glass) is a 1986 Indian Hindi-language drama film directed by Basu Chatterjee, starring Mithun Chakraborty, Moon Moon Sen, Vijayendra Ghatge and Mallika Sarabhai. The film was production coordinated by Mona Kapoor. The movie was based on a Bengali novel Mansamman, authored by Shankar. It was first Hindi movie about sexual harassment in office.

Plot
The film is a court room drama as well. Dinesh Prakash (Mithun Chakraborty) and Manisha (Moon Moon Sen) are in love and they get married. Now Dinesh is the executive director at B. C. Drugs located in Chembur. At a birthday celebration on 15 December, Manisha invites their friends including Advocate Ashok Kumar (Vijayendra Ghatge). But she is shocked beyond her senses when she finds out that her husband has been arrested and charged with the rape of Poonam (Mallika Sarabhai), a telephone operator. Has Dinesh really done any crime? Has Poonam created a trap for Dinesh? A movie ahead of its times, given the 'Me Too' syndrome. It also reflects a sad reality.

Cast
 Mithun Chakraborty as Dinesh Prakash 
 Moon Moon Sen as Manisha 
 Vijayendra Ghatge as Advocate Ashok Kumar
 Mallika Sarabhai as Poonam
 Guddi Maruti as Rajni
 Arvind Deshpande
 Madhumita as Deepa, Wife of Adv. Kumar
 Suresh Chatwal as Damodar
 Baby Naaz as Pramila Sood 
 Mrinalini as Mrs. Narayanan
 Nandita Thakur as Rukmini
 Bhagwan Sinha as Dr. H.L.Sharma
 Ravi Jhankal as Govind
 Sudha Chopra as Hairdresser 
 Manek Chaudhary as Dharmaraj
 Gauri Varma as Poonam's mom
 Ranjana Sachdev as Shyama
 Sonal Randhawa as Poonam's younger sister

Music

External links

References

1986 films
1980s Hindi-language films
Indian drama films
Films directed by Basu Chatterjee
Films scored by Bappi Lahiri
1986 drama films
Hindi-language drama films
Films based on works by Mani Shankar Mukherjee
Films based on Indian novels